is a Japanese footballer playing for Gainare Tottori.

Career
Sese has grown through Gainare Tottori youth ranks, then he got promoted to the top team in January 2018.

Club statistics
Updated to 29 August 2018.

References

External links

Profile at J. League
Profile at Gainare Tottori

1999 births
Living people
Association football people from Tottori Prefecture
Japanese footballers
J3 League players
Gainare Tottori players
Association football midfielders